Can't Dance may refer to:
"Can't Dance" (Lisa Stansfield song), 2013 
"Can't Dance" (Meghan Trainor song), 2018

See also
"I Can't Dance", a song
We Can't Dance, an album